Lucius Junius Brutus; Father of his Country is a Restoration tragedy play by Nathaniel Lee from 1680. It depicts the life of Roman statesman Lucius Junius Brutus. It was first staged at the Dorset Garden Theatre by the Duke's Company.

The original cast included Thomas Betterton as Lucius Junius Brutus, William Smith as  Titus, Joseph Williams as Tiberius, John Wiltshire as Collatinus, Thomas Gillow as Valerius, Henry Norris as Horatius, William Fieldhouse and Thomas Percival as Fecilian Priests, James Nokes as Vindicius, Thomas Jevon as  Fabritius, Mary Slingsby as  Sempronia, Mary Betterton as Lucretia and Elizabeth Barry as Teraminta. It was published the following year by Jacob Tonson, and dedicated to the Earl of Dorset.

Reception
The play became controversial at court and was suppressed after its third performance due to some lines from the character of Lucius Tarquinius Superbus (last king of Rome) that were taken to be a reflection on King Charles II.

Legacy
It served as an inspiration for the play The Tragedy of Brutus; or, The Fall of Tarquin by John Howard Payne.

References

1680 plays
Cultural depictions of Lucius Junius Brutus
Tragedy plays
Biographical plays
English Restoration plays
Plays by Nathaniel Lee
West End plays
Plays set in ancient Rome
Plays set in the 6th century BC